Brahmaea christophi is a moth in the  family Brahmaeidae. It was described by Staudinger in 1885. It is found in the humid forests of Talish on the territory of Azerbaijan and Iran. It was named by Otto Staudinger in honor of Hugo Theodor Christoph.

References

Natural History Museum Lepidoptera generic names catalog

Brahmaeidae
Moths described in 1885
Insects of Iran